Compton (also known as Mégantic—Compton—Stanstead) was a federal electoral district in Quebec, Canada, that was represented in the House of Commons of Canada from 1867 to 1949, and again from 1968 to 1997.

History

Compton was created by the British North America Act of 1867. It consisted of the Townships of Compton, Westbury, Eaton, Clifton, Hereford, and Augmentation, Bury, Newport, Auckland, Lingwick, Hampden, Ditton, Winslow, Whitton, Marston, Chesham and part of the Township of Clinton.

In 1924, it was re-defined to consist of:
 the County of Compton;
 in the County of Stanstead: the township of Hereford;
 in the County of Sherbrooke: the municipalities of Compton (township and village) and Waterville; and
 in the County of Frontenac: the municipalities of Marston South, Ste. Cécile de Whitton, Chesham, Winslow South, Clinton, St. Léon de Marston, Winslow North and the town of Mégantic.

In 1933, it was expanded to include the townships of Eaton and Westbury in the village of Ascot Corner.

It was abolished in 1947 when it was redistributed into the Compton—Frontenac and Sherbrooke electoral districts.

It was re-created in 1966 from parts of Compton—Frontenac, Mégantic and Stanstead ridings. The new riding was defined to consist of:
the Towns of Coaticook, Cookshire, East Angus, Lac-Mégantic, Rock Island, Scotstown and Waterville;
 the County of Compton;
 parts of the County of Frontenac;
 the county of Stanstead (except the village municipality of Omerville and the township municipality of Magog); and
 in the County of Sherbrooke: the village municipality of Compton; the township municipality of Compton; and the municipalities of Ascot Corner and Compton Station.

In 1976, it was expanded to include in the County of Stanstead: the village municipalities of Ayer's Cliff, Beebe Plain, Dixville, Hatley, North Hatley, Saint-Herménégilde and Stanstead Plain; the township municipalities of Barford, Barnston, Hatley, Hatley (West part) and Stanstead; the municipalities of Barnston West, Ogden, Sainte-Catherine-de-Hatley, Saint-Herménégilde, Saint-Mathieu-de-Dixville and Stanstead East.

It was renamed "Mégantic—Compton—Stanstead" in 1978.

In 1987, it was redefined to consist of:
 the Towns of Coaticook, Cookshire, East Angus, Lac-Mégantic, Rock Island, Scotstown and Waterville;
 the County of Compton;
 in the County of Frontenac: the parish municipalities of Courcelles, Saint-Augustin-de-Woburn and Val-Racine; the Township municipality of Marston; the municipalities of Audet, Frontenac, Lac-Drolet, Milan, Nantes, Notre-Dames-des-Bois, Piopolis, Sainte-Cécile-de-Whitton, Saint-Romain, Saint-Sébastien and Stornoway;
 in the County of Sherbrooke: the Township Municipality of Ascot; the Municipality of Ascot Corner;
 in the County of Stanstead excluding the following: the Town of Magog; the Village Municipality of Omerville; the Township Municipality of Magog;
 in the County of Wolfe: the village municipalities of Bishopton, Marbleton, Saint-Gérard and Weedon-Centre; the township municipalities of Dudswell, Stratford and Weedon; the municipality of Fontainebleau.

It was abolished in 1996 when it was merged into Compton—Stanstead riding.

Members of Parliament

This riding elected the following Members of Parliament:

Election results

Compton, 1867–1949

By-election:  On Mr. Pope's appointment as Minister of Agriculture, 25 October 1871

By-election: On Mr. Pope's appointment as Minister of Agriculture, 17 October 1878

By-election: On Mr. Pope's death, 1 April 1889

By-election: On election being declared void, Nov. 22, 1905

Compton, 1968–1979

Mégantic—Compton—Stanstead, 1979–1997

See also 

 List of Canadian federal electoral districts
 Past Canadian electoral districts

External links

Riding history from the Library of Parliament:
Compton 1867-1947
Compton 1966-1978
Mégantic—Compton—Stanstead 1978- 1996

Former federal electoral districts of Quebec